Fortitude is a 2020 internationally co-produced drama film directed by Jorge Thielen Armand. It premiered in the Tiger Competition of the 49th International Film Festival Rotterdam. A co-production between Venezuela, Colombia, France and The Netherlands, the film premiered in Venezuelan cinemas on 23 December 2021.

Plot 
La Fortaleza is inspired by the real life story of the filmmaker's father, Jorge Roque Thielen, who in turn plays the main character. It is noted that the film oscillates between fiction and reality.

Roque, the protagonist, dives into the jungle to escape from his alcoholism, his demons and the social and economic crisis in Venezuela. However, the meeting with old friends and the promises of gold at a work in a mine divert his desire for redemption and he enters a vicious circle of violence around mining. This will make him sink in a cycle that devours his interior. In that moment, he will need the fortitude to emerge from the darkness and walk toward a new beginning.

Cast 

 Jorge Roque Thielen H.
 Carlos "Fagua" Medina
 Yoni Naranjo
 Leudys Naranjo

Reception 
Jordan Cronk of Film Comment claimed that La Fortaleza was "a solemn tale of exile and redemption". Sergio Monsalve of El Nacional wrote that "in its paradoxes lies the best cinema of Venezuela". It also received the Special Mention in the Rome Independent Film Festival 2020. It was awarded the Grand Prix Marchica for Best Film and the Best Actor Award at the Festival International De Cinéma Et De Mémoire Commune in Nador, Morocco.

It won the Audience Award for Best Film at the Iberoamerican Film Festival of Quito.

The film was released concurrently with El Father Plays Himself, a documentary by Mo Scarpelli about the making of La Fortaleza.

Awards and nominations

References

External links 
 
 La Fortaleza at FilmAffinity.

2020 films
2020 drama films
Venezuelan drama films
Colombian drama films
French drama films
Dutch drama films
Canadian drama films
Spanish-language French films
Spanish-language Canadian films
2020s Colombian films
2020s French films